John Jasinski may refer to:
 John Jasinski (academic administrator), president of Northwest Missouri State University
 John Jasinski (politician), member of the Minnesota Senate
 John Zenon Jasinski, bishop of the Polish National Catholic Church